Daniel Paul Connolly (born September 2, 1982) is a former American football player. He was signed by the Jacksonville Jaguars as an undrafted free agent in 2005 after playing college football at Southeast Missouri State. Connolly played eight seasons for the New England Patriots, winning Super Bowl XLIX over the Seattle Seahawks in his final season.

Early years
Connolly was born in Chesterfield, Missouri. He attended Marquette High School in Chesterfield, Missouri and was a letterman in Football and track. In football, he was a two-time All-District selection and a two-time All-Conference selection. In track and field, he threw the shot put.

College career
He was a four-year starting offensive tackle for Southeast Missouri State, and was in All-Conference teams for four consecutive seasons, and finished his collegiate career with 46 consecutive starts.

Professional career

2005 NFL combine

Jacksonville Jaguars (2005–2007)
Connolly was signed by the Jacksonville Jaguars as an undrafted free agent on April 24, 2005. He made the team's 53-man roster and spent the rest of the season on it. He was placed on injured reserve by the Jaguars on September 2, 2006. Connolly was waived by the Jaguars on September 1, 2007.

New England Patriots (2007–2014)
Connolly was signed to the New England Patriots' practice squad on September 13, 2007, where he spent the remainder of the season before being re-signed to a future contract on February 5, 2008. He was then waived by the Patriots on October 20, 2008. He was re-signed to the team's practice squad on October 22. He was promoted to the active roster on December 13, 2008.

Connolly made the 53-man roster in 2009 and started four games at right guard in place of an injured Stephen Neal. During the season, he received a contract extension through the 2011 season.

With veteran starter Logan Mankins missing from the first seven games of the 2010 season due to a contract situation, Connolly started all of those games in his place at left guard. He was a reserve for the team's Week 9 game, but returned to the starting lineup at right guard following a season-ending injury to Neal.

In a December 19, 2010 game against the Green Bay Packers, Connolly set the record for the longest kickoff return by an offensive lineman in NFL history, returning a squib kick 71 yards to set up a Patriots touchdown (the previous record was 48 yards by Mal Snider in 1969). Connolly was named AFC Special Teams Player of the Week for the feat. Connolly suffered a concussion in the game and missed the final two games of the regular season. He finished the 2010 season with 13 starts in 14 games played.

At the end of the 2011 season, Connolly and the Patriots appeared in Super Bowl XLVI. He started in the game, but the Patriots lost to the New York Giants by a score of 21–17.

On September 3, 2014, Connolly was named one of the Patriots' six team captains. On February 1, 2015, he was part of the Patriots team that won Super Bowl XLIX over the Seattle Seahawks, 28–24.

Retirement
A free agent after the 2014 season, Connolly fielded interest from multiple NFL teams. However, on July 16, 2015, Connolly retired, citing family stability, concussion injuries and winning the Super Bowl as contributing factors.

References

External links
 New England Patriots bio
 Southeast Missouri Redhawks bio

1982 births
Living people
American football centers
American football offensive guards
American football offensive tackles
Jacksonville Jaguars players
New England Patriots players
Players of American football from St. Louis
Southeast Missouri State Redhawks football players